The Super Heavyweight class in the 1st AIBA African Olympic Boxing Qualifying Tournament competition was the lightest class.  Super Heavyweights were limited to those boxers weighing more than 91 kilograms.

List of boxers

Medalists

Results

Semifinal Round

Final Round

Qualification to Olympic games

References
AIBA

AIBA African 2008 Olympic Qualifying Tournament